Lev Meshberg (April 15, 1933, Odessa – July 17, 2007, Carrara) was a Soviet and American painter. Meshberg's paintings are autobiographical, filled with symbols and enigmas relating to his own existence.  A figurative painter and colorist, his paintings are a combination of readily discernible objects and almost ethereal renderings of other objects with dream-like light and color.  He worked still another dimension into his art, depth - a physical depth - achieved by build-up of pigments and other materials to add a sculptural dimension to his paintings. The subtlety of color and true originality of composition and uniqueness of his three-dimensional method of painting brought Meshberg world-wide attention. His works were widely exhibited and purchased by numerous museums and private collectors all over the world.

Early life 
Lev Meshberg was born in Odessa, Ukrainian SSR, on April 15, 1933. He started painting and drawing in his early childhood. In 1946 he received First Prize in the Ukrainian Annual Art Contest. In 1950 he began to study painting and drawing at Odessa College of Fine Art. At graduation in 1958 he received the school's highest honors. In 1960 he was accepted as a full member of the Union of Soviet Artists. He was named in 1967 as one of six best painters in Russia. In 1973 he, his wife and their son Andrew emigrated to the US, along with hundreds of painters and sculptors who left the Soviet Union for the United States, as a way to escape the difficulties of being an 'unofficial' artist during a time when the dominant style of social realism prevailed in Russian society. This group of artists include Mikhail Chemiakin, Oleg Tselkov and Igor Tulipanov. The difficulties 'unofficial' artists experienced in their own society fueled the interest of Americans in these artists. The circles of Soviet intellectuals, professionals, and even members of the communist political hierarchy who were interested in their work reinforced the attraction of these artists to westerners.

Career 
In the Soviet Union, Meshberg participated in more than forty one-man and group exhibitions, winning prizes at two All-Union Art Exhibitions for Best Painting of the show (1965, 1967). In the United States, Meshberg was represented first by Eduard Nakhamkin Fine Arts Gallery and then by the Franklin Bowles Galleries in New York and San Francisco. During his lifetime he also taught art privately; his principle students were John Currin, Andrew Meshberg and Leon Lumelsky. Currin, who credits Meshberg with instilling in him his love of art and teaching him the fundamentals of 19th century painting technique, studied with Meshberg when he was a teenager. Currin started out taking violin lessons from Meshberg's wife at the time - Asya Meshberg - but his mother pushed him to take lessons with Meshberg. Currin has said Meshberg is a ' ... wonderful, wonderful painter, very good painter'. Currin is quoted as saying "Lev told me he thought I was going to be a good artist, a famous artist,” he recalls. “At that time, I thought art was something that had sort of petered out. I knew about de Kooning and Pollock, but it seemed like after that it was all performance art and things like the ‘Spiral Jetty,’ and that completely didn’t interest me. It was the romantic thing with Lev that appealed, the studio with oil paints and birds in cages and old books and blotted still-lifes. The idea that you would be yearning to cast all that off, the shackles of ossified European culture, never took with me."

Meshberg worked in Darien, Connecticut, New York City from the years of 1973 to 2001. In 2001 he moved to Carrara, Italy where he lived until his death on July 17, 2007.

References 

1933 births
2007 deaths
American painters
Artists from Odesa
Soviet emigrants to the United States
Soviet painters